Huddersfield Town's 1928–29 campaign was a season that saw Town fall from grace, finishing down in 16th place, a far cry from their top 2 finishes in the past 5 seasons. They did manage to reach the semi-finals of the FA Cup, but it didn't stop Jack Chaplin losing his job at the end of the season.

Squad at the start of the season

Review
The Terriers seemed to be on top of the world during the last 5 seasons of league football. After winning the title for 3 seasons in a row and finishing 2nd the next 2 seasons, some were wondering what would happen during this season. Unfortunately, they should not have asked. The only good points of the season came from 3 of the 14 league wins, 6-1 victories over Yorkshire rivals Leeds United and Sheffield United and a 7-1 win over Pennine rivals Burnley. They also reached the semi-finals of the FA Cup, before losing to Bolton Wanderers at Anfield.

Squad at the end of the season

Results

Division One

FA Cup

Appearances and goals

1928-29
English football clubs 1928–29 season